A strut is a structural component.

Strut(s) may also refer to:

Technology and computing
 Strut (typesetting), a vertical rule with no width
 Strut bar, an automotive suspension accessory
 Strut channel, a standardized formed structural system
 MacPherson strut, a component of some vehicle suspensions
 Apache Struts, a web application framework for Java

Film and television
Strut (TV series), a 2016 American reality show
Strut!, a documentary film by Max Raab

Music
 The Struts, an English rock band
 Strut Records, a British record label

Albums
 Strut (album) or the title song (see below), by Lenny Kravitz 2014
 Strut, by Kevin Toney, 2001
 Strut, by Michael Kaeshammer, 2004

Songs
 "Strut" (The Cheetah Girls song), 2006
 "Strut" (Lenny Kravitz song), 2014
 "Strut" (Sheena Easton song), 1984
 "Strut", a song by Adam Lambert from For Your Entertainment, 2009
 "Strut", a song by KMFDM from Blitz, 2009
 "Strut", a song by Taj Mahal from Dancing the Blues, 1993

See also
 "Her Strut", a 1980 song by Bob Seger
 Strutt, a surname
 Strutter (disambiguation)